These are attacks that have occurred on school property or related primarily to school issues or events. A narrow definition of attack is used for this list to exclude attacks during warfare, robberies, gang violence, political or police attacks (as related to protests), accidents, single suicides, and murder-suicides by rejected spouses or suitors, as they are not the type of mass murder event that is the focus of concern. Incidents that involved only staff who work at the school have been classified as belonging at List of workplace killings. It also excludes events where no injuries take place, if an attack is foiled. Accounts without reliable sources are excluded.

Primary school and kindergarten incidents

See also
 School bullying
 School shooting
 School violence
 List of school-related attacks
 List of attacks related to secondary schools
 List of attacks related to post-secondary schools
 List of rampage killers: School massacres

References

Notes

External links
 National School Safety and Security Services. School-Related Deaths, School Shootings, & School Violence Incidents: 
2000–2001 
2002–2003
2004–2005
2006–2007
2007–2008
2008–2009
2009–2010

Crime-related lists
primary